"Utopia" is the first single from the Dutch symphonic metal and rock band Within Temptation's live album An Acoustic Night at the Theatre. The song features guest vocals from Chris Jones, a British singer. The single was released on 23 October 2009.

Formats and track listings
2-track single
"Utopia" (3:50)
"Restless" (Live at Beursgebouw Eindhoven 23-11-2007) (5:59)

Reception
Alistair Lawrence of BBC Music called the track "nothing more than a custom-built acoustic ballad, but ensures their fans go home having heard something new".

Music video
The video was posted on Within Temptation's official YouTube page on 28 September 2009. It is directed by Oscar Verpoort. The video shows a man walking around a city witnessing various people committing crimes, such as a man stealing a blind woman's wallet and a prostitute being picked up by an older man. He saves a child from almost being hit by a car when his mother wasn't paying attention to what he was doing. As the boy looks back, there is nobody there, suggesting that the man was an angel-like apparition. The band is also seen performing in a run down building. It is also the last video to feature drummer Stephen van Haestregt who departed the band in 2010.

Charts

References

Within Temptation Myspace 

2009 singles
2000s ballads
Rock ballads
Within Temptation songs
Songs written by Sharon den Adel
Heavy metal ballads
2009 songs
Sony BMG singles